Sophie Chang was the defending champion, but chose not to participate.

Marie Benoît won the title, defeating Emma Navarro in the final, 6–2, 7–5.

Seeds

Draw

Finals

Top half

Bottom half

References

Main Draw

Vero Beach International - Singles